Anthonyville is a town in Crittenden County, Arkansas, United States. The population was 161 at the 2010 census, down from 250 in 2000.

Geography
Anthonyville is located in southern Crittenden County at  (35.039443, -90.340734). Highway 147 continues south  to the Horseshoe Lake area.

Demographics

As of the census of 2000, there were 250 people, 82 households, and 52 families residing in the town.  The population density was 877.5/km2 (2,365.9/mi2).  There were 87 housing units at an average density of 305.4/km2 (823.3/mi2).  The racial makeup of the town was 2.80% White, 96.40% Black or African American, 0.80% from other races.  0.80% of the population were Hispanic or Latino of any race.

There were 82 households, out of which 34.1% had children under the age of 18 living with them, 34.1% were married couples living together, 23.2% had a female householder with no husband present, and 35.4% were non-families. 32.9% of all households were made up of individuals, and 14.6% had someone living alone who was 65 years of age or older.  The average household size was 3.05 and the average family size was 4.02.

In the town, the population was spread out, with 38.4% under the age of 18, 6.4% from 18 to 24, 24.4% from 25 to 44, 15.6% from 45 to 64, and 15.2% who were 65 years of age or older.  The median age was 31 years. For every 100 females, there were 115.5 males.  For every 100 females age 18 and over, there were 108.1 males.

The median income for a household in the town was $23,750, and the median income for a family was $32,344. Males had a median income of $25,357 versus $18,636 for females. The per capita income for the town was $8,825.  About 28.4% of families and 32.2% of the population were below the poverty line, including 36.2% of those under the age of eighteen and 48.7% of those 65 or over.

Education
Residents are zoned to schools in the West Memphis School District, which operates Academies of West Memphis (formerly West Memphis High School).

References

External links
Crittenden County website

Towns in Crittenden County, Arkansas
Towns in Arkansas
Memphis metropolitan area